Pugoy – Hostage: Davao is a 1993 Filipino action film directed by Francis "Jun" Posadas. The film stars Ian Veneracion as Felipe Pugoy. The film is based on the 1989 Davao hostage crisis. Produced by First Films, the film was released in early 1993.

Plot
This film is about the story of Felipe Pugoy, a troubled inmate who, with his gang, instigated a hostage crisis in a Davao City prison that led to 21 deaths (5 hostages and 16 inmates, including Pugoy) in 1989. Among them were a visiting Australian female missionary Jacqueline Hamill with the evangelical Joyful Assembly of God.

Cast
Ian Veneracion as Felipe Pugoy
Lito Legaspi as Mayor Antonio Duwalde (based on Mayor Rodrigo Duterte)
Roy Alvarez as Lt. Col. Franco Calida
Gina Pangle as Jacqueline Raye Hamill
Mark Gil as Mohammad Nazir Samparani

References

External links

1993 films
Action films based on actual events
Filipino-language films
Films about hostage takings
Philippine action films
First Films films
Films directed by Francis Posadas